Novin (also Romanized as Novīn, Nowīn, Navīn, and Nāwin; also known as Novan) is a village in Shalyar Rural District, Uraman District, Sarvabad County, Kurdistan Province, Iran. At the 2006 census, its population was 727, in 179 families. The village is populated by Kurds.

References 

Towns and villages in Sarvabad County
Kurdish settlements in Kurdistan Province